Chasing Papi is a 2003 American comedy film directed by Linda Mendoza (in her feature film directorial debut) and starring Roselyn Sánchez, Sofía Vergara, Jaci Velasquez, and Eduardo Verástegui. The women discover that their boyfriend has been dating all three of them at the same time—a discovery that leads them on an adventure throughout Los Angeles, California.

Plot

The movie opens with an animated telling of Tomás Fuentes (Eduardo Verástegui)'s life, in which he is always surrounded by women. In his current life, he is a representative for the Olivero & Sanchez Marketing Group in Los Angeles and is busy travelling to visit all three of his girlfriends to give them each a gift. Cici (Sofía Vergara), a cocktail waitress from Miami who enjoys being the center of attention; Patricia Sofia Ordonez Coronado del Pescador (Jaci Velasquez), a debutante of New York's high society who is tired of her mother's (María Conchita Alonso) endless attempts to marry her off; and Lorena Morales (Roselyn Sánchez), a lawyer from Chicago who loves how Tomas makes her feel sexy; have fallen for him and given him the affectionate nickname "Papi". This love triangle of sorts affects Tomás's work life, causing him to pass out during a presentation. His doctor (Ian Gomez) learns of the love triangle, tells Tomás to choose only one woman, prescribes tranquilizers and advises against driving, alcohol, and women.

By coincidence, all three of his girlfriends go to Los Angeles after hearing their horoscopes read by fortune teller Walter Mercado on Univision's Primer Impacto. The three women arrive at his house while he is at the doctor's. Instead of fighting each other, all three agree to leave and quit Tomas cold turkey as revenge for his cheating on them. In their absence, Tomás arrives home and takes his tranquilizers with alcohol. The girls each have second thoughts about leaving and return to confront Tomás directly. First Lorena, then Patricia and finally Cici, causing Tomás to overdose on alcohol and tranquilizers and pass out again.

Mary, Tomás' secretary, calls hoping that he is doing better. Outside Tomas' house, FBI agent Carmen Rivera (Lisa Vidal), is waiting. She followed Cici to Los Angeles as part of an investigation. Fala, Cici's business partner, had Cici do her boyfriend, Ricky, a favor by taking a car that he sold online to the buyer in Los Angeles. Ricky is involved in the Whittaker counterfeit ring that Agent Rivera is investigating. The girls spot her while panicking about what to do with Tomas and think she is "the L.A. woman" who just called, probably from a cell phone.

Scared by Agent Rivera's firearm, the girls decide to take Tomás out of the house and wait until he wakes up and decide which girl he wants to be with. They load all their bags in Ricky's car and, after a short chase, they decide to stay at a Marriott hotel instead of a Motel 6. Unfortunately, Patricia's credit cards have been canceled by her mother. However, Lorena is their saving grace. The Miss Latina American Beauty Pageant is being held in that very same hotel and Miss Puerto Rico's flight was delayed. Lorena bears a resemblance to the real beauty contestant and takes her place. Cici passes herself and Patricia off as her staff. When moving their bags to Miss Puerto Rico's room, a bag falls off the cart onto the luggage room floor. In the hotel room, all three girls have dinner, empty three bottles of champagne and share their life stories with each other. They each then have a dream in which they end up with Tomás but feel bad about leaving the other two behind.

The next morning, Lorena has to meet the judges and Cici has to deliver Ricky's car to a man named Rodrigo (D.L. Hughley) who apparently bought it. They leave Tomás but, in their absence, he's taken by Agent Rivera who has followed them to the hotel. It turns out Rodrigo was not interested in the car but a bag that was supposed to be in the trunk. Upon returning to the hotel with Rodrigo's associate, Victor (Freddy Rodriguez), the girls discover Tomás is missing and a note that reads, "If you want your Papi back, bring the money to the Don Quixote puppet at L.A. Latin festival at 5 PM. No cops."

Patricia knocks Victor out with a lamp and Cici calls Fala in Miami for answers about the car but doesn't get any. All that is left is to do what the note says. They are interrupted by Costas Delgado (Paul Rodriguez, uncredited), the director of the pageant, who has been looking for Lorena and needs her to meet with the judges immediately. Patricia finds the extra bag filled with money in the luggage room and Cici gets a map to the festival. Victor comes to, calls Rodrigo and they plan to catch the girls at the festival.

While Miss Mexico is being interviewed, Lorena unbuttons her blouse slightly to show off her cleavage and Costas helps her with her sash. During Lorena's interview, Patricia and Cici arrive but so does the real Miss Puerto Rico, who outs Lorena as an impostor. Cici trips her, allowing all three to escape. Tomás wakes up in Agent Rivera's car. Agent Rivera tells him she intends to use him and the girls in order to detain Victor and Rodrigo. They follow the girls to the festival as they leave in Ricky's car.

On the way, the girls' car breaks down completely. They steal a Harley-Davidson motorcycle, which Patricia knows how to drive, promising the owner to bring it right back. They lose both the map and Agent Rivera in another chase. Upon arrival, the girls see the puppet is behind the stage. Running through the crowd to avoid the cops, Patricia loses one of her colored contact lenses. Since she looks "so much better without all that money", she simply takes the other one out. Victor and Rodrigo spot them and the girls run on stage where Sheila E. is performing and dance to singer Christina Vidal's song, Dejaré, regardless of their mixed dance backgrounds. Victor and Rodrigo get closer to the stage, causing the girls to run off mid-performance. They all run to the puppet, where Carmen and other FBI agents surround them and apprehend Victor and Rodrigo. Tomás is reunited with all three of his girlfriends. He apologizes to them for his deception and is unable to choose between them. The girls, however, have all found their inner strengths and choose to leave him instead. Tomás decides to take Agent Carmen's advice and spend some time alone after taking her out for dinner. Returning to the festival crowds, the girls are invited to return to the stage where they dance to Christina Vidal's song It's All About Nothing.

The movie's timeline advances five months later and the girls have kept in touch. Patricia has moved into her own apartment with her dog Fifi and has gotten a job at an art gallery. Cici is an entertainer on a cruise liner with her business partner Fala. Lorena is still a lawyer working pro-bono but puts her time off to good use and becomes the self-proclaimed "Queen of Tango". Fifi hears her horoscope that advises her to "go outside the door because love is waiting for [her]." The movie ends with Fifi finding her "Puppy Chulo."

Cast
Roselyn Sánchez as Lorena
Sofía Vergara as Cici
Jaci Velasquez as Patricia
Eduardo Verástegui as Tomás "Papi" Fuentes
Lisa Vidal as Carmen
Freddy Rodríguez as Victor
D.L. Hughley as Rodrigo
María Conchita Alonso as Maria
Walter Mercado as himself
Carlos Ponce as himself
Joy Enriquez as Mary
Ian Gomez	as Doctor Chu
Diana-Maria Riva as Fala (as Diana Maria Riva)
Ivette Sosa as Gloria
Bárbara Bermudo as Miami TV Reporter

Cameos and appearances
The movie features several cameo appearances, including singer Carlos Ponce and Primer Impacto news reporter Bárbara Bermudo.

Other entertainers who act in the film include the lead singer of the Pussycat Dolls, Nicole Scherzinger and her fellow ex-Eden's Crush member Ivette Sosa, and María Conchita Alonso.

Critical response
Critics gave generally negative reviews of Chasing Papi. Rotten Tomatoes gave it a rating of 14% based on 49 reviews. On Metacritic, it has a score of 33% based on reviews from 23 critics, indicating "generally unfavorable reviews".

Elizabeth Weitzman from the New York Daily News wrote "The credits on this film are genuinely impressive: Each of the talented actresses is already a popular Latina star, and the film was produced by Forest Whitaker, who directed Waiting to Exhale. No doubt he expected it to speak to an underrecognized audience in the way that one did. Instead, it just speaks down to them and the rest of us."

Lael Loewenstein of Variety criticized the film for having "[a] relatively predictable twists of fate and deus ex machina contrivances [that] don't hold up under scrutiny", adding that "it's better to accept them as part of the film's zany comic universe and not ask questions".

References

External links

2003 romantic comedy films
20th Century Fox films
American romantic comedy films
Films set in California
2000s Spanish-language films
2003 directorial debut films
2000s English-language films
2000s American films
2003 multilingual films
American multilingual films